Roman Tarek (born 14 April 1987) is a Slovak football defender who currently plays for the DOXXbet liga club ŠKF Sereď. He also played for Inter Bratislava and FK Senica.

External links

References

1987 births
Living people
Slovak footballers
Association football defenders
FK Inter Bratislava players
FK Senica players
Slovak Super Liga players